Tarica District is one of twelve districts of the province Huaraz in Peru.

Geography 
The Cordillera Blanca traverses the district. Some of the highest peaks of the district are Ranrapallqa, and Tuqllarahu. Other mountains are listed below:

 Hatun Kunka
 Uqshapallqa
 Yanarahu

Ethnic groups 
The people in the district are mainly indigenous citizens of Quechua descent. Quechua is the language which the majority of the population (68.31%) learnt to speak in childhood, 31.53% of the residents started speaking using the Spanish language (2007 Peru Census).

References

Districts of the Huaraz Province
Districts of the Ancash Region